The International Wrestling Association is a conglomerate of professional wrestling promotions that originated in Puerto Rico and currently operates there and in the state of Florida. Founded in 1999 by promoter Víctor Quiñones (who had also created the unrelated IWA-Japan in 1994) as a novel promotion, it quickly entered an agreement to serve as a development territory for the World Wrestling Federation (now known as WWE) that lasted until 2001. During its first decade, IWA grew to rival the long-standing World Wrestling Council (WWC). Its business model relies on pushing younger talents, using veterans and foreign wrestlers to get them over with the public.

Besides a number of alliances with foreign promotions that included Total Nonstop Action (now known as Impact Wrestling), International Wrestling Association of Japan, IWA Mid-South, and Ring of Honor (ROH), the company was also a member of the National Wrestling Alliance between 2007 and 2008. After its original incarnation ceased operations in 2012, the trade name was salvaged and relaunched under the World Wrestling League (WWL) in April 2018, making way for the reactivation of the spinoff based in Florida three months later. On October 24, 2018, the reopening of IWA-PR was also announced.

History

IWA-WWF (1999–2000)
The International Wrestling Association had a working agreement with the World Wrestling Federation in the first year of operations from 1999 to 2000. During that time some developmental and regular WWF talent often appeared on IWA Puerto Rico shows. That included The Rock's first and only wrestling match in Puerto Rico on April 28, 2000 at Paquito Montaner Stadium in Ponce, Puerto Rico when he teamed with Kane against the Dudley Boyz. During that year IWA began promoting two of their most popular annual events, IWA Christmas in PR and Histeria Boricua. On the second night IWA Christmas in PR Histeria Boricua on January 6, 1999 at "Juan Pachin Vicens Auditorium" on Ponce, Puerto Rico with Kane vs. The Undertaker on the main event drew 15.000 fans, the largest crowd for a wrestling event in Ponce.

IWA vs. WWC (2000–2006)

NWA membership, Unification (2007–2008)
On January 6, 2008, deposed WWC Universal Heavyweight Champion Biggie Size, WWC Television Champion Ash Rubinsky and heel stablemates "Los Templarios", all appeared at Histeria Boricua. The main spot of the show had Biggie Size (with WWC's title on hand) challenged IWA's Heavyweight Champion Blitz, in a unification bout. During the event WWC's Director of Merchandising and announcer Carlos Muñiz attempted to retrieve the belt, a situation that was used in IWA footage as "sanctioning" of the unification. Two days after, the WWC and Carlos Colón threatened to pursue legal action and Big returned the belt.

Following an administrative dispute between Vega/Pérez and Mario Savoldi, IWA lost part of its roster including Ray González and Los Aéreos (Carlitos & Hiram Tua), and the creation of an offshoot named International Wrestling Entertainment (IWE) was proposed by the latter using the talent that defected.

Foreign use of the brand
Since at least May 19, 2011, independent Mexican wrestler Exorcista had made the claim of being the "IWA Puerto Rico Champion" in social media, being billed as such in appearances throughout the summer, wearing an unlicensed belt (with a sideplate globe design similar to that of the IWA World Tag Team Championship's centerplate) to sell the ruse. On August 5, 2011, Mexico City-based independent promotion Lucha Libre Mexicana del Sureste teased the participation of the purported "IWA World Heavyweight" and CMLL World Middleweight within the promotion. For its first defense that took place two days later, the name of the bootleg title was amended to the fictional "IWA World Lightweight Championship", although it was still promoted as a heavyweight championship afterwards. For another appearance that took place on September 17, 2011, LLMS used the IWA's actual logo to promote the card. On October 12, 2012, former Undisputed World Heavyweight Champion Enrique "Ricky" Cruz denounced that the brand had been appropriated in a message to his followers in Mexico (where he performed for International Wrestling Revolution Group), since a backstory had been created for the "IWA Lightweight Championship" where Exorcista had won it from him.

On November 10, 2011, promoter José E. Mateo launched an independent offshoot named IWA Florida with the approval of Savio Vega, basing it in the city of Orlando in the eponymous American state where a significant portion of the Puerto Rican diaspora is located. Although the company's actual name was Independent Wrestling Association, it used the same logo as IWA Puerto Rico due to their inter-promotional affiliation. During its run (2011–2012), Vega also performed as part of the roster.

Recess, interpromotional events and bankruptcy (2011–2012)
Late 2011 the company took a recess to restructure the company and return a few months later in 2012 and make inter-promotional shows with WWC and EWO, but the administration confronted economic problems and announced that it would enter another recess. IWA main figure Savio Vega then started working for WWC as wrestler and occasional booker.

World Wrestling League (2014–2017)
When the World Wrestling League (WWL) shifted its focus from international tours to more home events in 2014, it acquired several locals including Savio Vega and Dennis Rivera. An invasion by IWA talents began at the 2015 International Cup, where Vega made his intentions of taking over and renaming the promotion clear. However, two days after the event owner Richard Negrín announced that the promotion was shutting down as part of a public diatribe, entering a period of inactivity that lasted until June and aborting the angle. Vega was brought back in March 2016, beginning another angle that hinted at his intentions of taking over WWL and relaunching IWA, which included having an edition of WWL High Voltage replaced with Impacto Total.

In July 2016, with the angle still unfinished, Negrín entered another sabbatical citing health issues and Vega acquired the promotion. WWL retained its acronym and initially served as a spiritual successor to the IWA, first using flashbacks of his work as General Manager to place him in a similar role as president and then resuming and concluding an unfinished storyline from 2006. The year was concluded with the revival of Christmas in PR, in which the downfall of the IWA was used as a plot element. In May 2017, Golpe de Estado was also reintroduced, with the backlash of Vega's long history of authority abuse dating back to the IWA as the main storyline behind a coup d'état by long running booker Héctor "MoodyJack" Meléndez, in which both him and Dennis Rivera were ousted from the company.

Team IWA's invasion of WWL (2018)

The passing of hurricane Maria over Puerto Rico forced WWL into an eight-month hiatus, with Juicio Final being revived to serve as its return show. In the event, Vega and Rivera made their return along Noel Rodríguez and announced themselves as Team Savio/IWA (later completed by Richard Rondón and Roxy Tirado). WWL president Manny Ferno opposed them in representation of WWL, along the stable known as Puros Machos that he led. When the promotion for Golpe de Estado 2018 began, the brand was formally reintroduced with the unveiling of a new logo and the reintroduction of several titles. The event featured the first confrontation between factions, with Team Manny/WWL emerging victorious and preventing the name change in the first attempt. However, the storyline continued with Ferno intending to "destroy" the legacy of the brand after "breaking the man" and grew to include Shane Sewell and Slash Venom, in representation of IWA.

Former Impacto Total/Zona Caliente narrator Axel Cruz was brought in to join WWL's High Voltage team, while the segment El Tocotón also made a comeback led by Stefano. A rematch was pushed, while emphasis was placed on the fact that Team Savio had only one of the wrestlers that headlined the IWA during its peak (himself) and that one of the members (Roxy Tirado) had never been part of the promotion. IWA picked two straight wins over WWL at Summer Blast (later being joined by Jesús Castillo Jr.) and War in the West, with a returning Apolo being approached by Vega and a disappointed Mr. Big by Ferno. The storyline, however, was written off following a skit where the leader of Puro Macho supposedly ordered an "accident" on his counterpart.

On July 20, 2018, a relaunch of IWA Florida was announced, this time with the inclusion of narrator Willie Urbina to the staff. Additionally, a tournament to fill the vacancies for the Undisputed World Heavyweight and World Tag Team Championships was scheduled. This initiative ultimately led to Savio Vega leaving WWL, of which he was a minority owner, to focus on the first card to be held under the brand in more than six years.

Corporate revival (2018–2019)

On October 24, 2018, Savio Vega announced the return of the original incarnation of the International Wrestling Association in Puerto Rico, with its return show scheduled for 2019. This followed the reactivation of its official accounts earlier that week. On the other hand, IWA-FL held its first set of tapings on October 27, 2018. In November, the spinoff announced that it would host Histeria Boricua in 2019, in a revelation that also featured the debut of longtime rival headliner Carly Colón under the brand.

On November 29, 2018, Vega announced that the first series to be held by IWA-PR, Impacto Total: El Tour, which was scheduled for January. The IWA also reached agreements with several other local promotions (including WWC and Champion Wrestling Association, which had replaced EWO as the largest independent in the scene in the years since) for the use of classic roster talents that had moved on during the hiatus. To close the book on WWL, Puro Macho was brought in and featured in a confrontation against Vega, Sewell, Apolo and Dennis Rivera over the angle that had been dropped months before. As part of its relaunch, IWA-PR became involved with charity events. Savinovich was brought back, promoting the event in the media.

Alliances with WWC and MLW; UPLL (2020–2021)
On February 13, 2020, a video where Ray González extended an invitation to Savio Vega to attend a WWC to present him with a proposal that would be mutually beneficial was posted in the IWA-PR's social media platforms. After some anticipation, the summon was accepted in a subsequent segment aired in Superestrellas de la Lucha Libre. On February 15, 2020, Vega accepted a copy of the document from González and informed that he would give his final answer at the IWA-PR event Histeria Boricua 2020. During this skit, the heel faction known as Dynasty (composed by Eddie Colón, Gilbert and Peter John Ramos) where placed in antagonism to the agreement. The COVID-19 pandemic pauses the progression of the storyline, but both promotions passively helped each other by sharing their weekly shows.

After Savio Vega's arrival to Major League Wrestling (MLW) in June 2019, a de facto collaboration between both promotions began, with the emergence of angles involving the IWA Caribbean Heavyweight Championship and Salina de la Renta. In addition, the eventual arrival of MLW World Heavyweight Champion Jacob Fatu and Josef Samael (collectively known as Contra Unit) to IWA-PR was announced prior to the global outbreak, this as part of a collaboration with PCW Ultra.

In July 2020, the creation of a regional alliance known as the Unión Panamericana de Lucha Libre (lit. “Pan American Union of Professional Wrestling”) was announced, with IWA-PR joining Society Action Wrestling (SAW-WAG) of Colombia, Súper Lucha Panamá of Panama, ARENA Fight: El Renacer Maya of Nicaragua and Renegados Lucha of Costa Rica as founding members.

In October 2020, IWA-PR's association with MLW evolved into a formal strategic alliance for the “celebration of inter-promotional events, direct support to the events of each of the companies and collaboration in other types of promotions”. It was later incorporated into a storyline between Vega and Salina de la Renta over the acquisition by a shady entity known as Azteca Underground.

IWE Takeover IWA (2021-Present)

In mid, end of 2021 Fernando Tonos Along side of Many Ferno founded IWE (International Wrestling Entertainment) (Name and idea Dropped on 2008), Tonos says he get a percentage of control on IWA and after the group won all the IWA Championships they rename it and claim as part of IWE rename it all as IWA/IWE.

In Juicio Final the company IWA announce they gonna crown new champions (New IWA World Heavyweight, New IWA Intercontinental Champion & New IWA Tag Team Champions) after the event the company got 2 champions in all divisions except for the Caribbean Championship. (As part of IWE takeover IWA angle)

Throughout 2022, Epico Colón’s Latin American Wrestling Entertainment (LAWE) was IWA-PR’s direct competition, temporarily displacing WWC in ticket sales and successful events. The sudden folding of this promotion allowed others to pick wrestlers that were previously contracted. IWA-PR secured LAWE World Heavyweight Champion Pedro Portillo III, who began appearing masked and carrying the belt inside a black pouch, as Noriega had done with the WWC Universal Heavyweight Championship in 2008.

Annual events
Histeria Boricua
Noche de Campeones
Jucio Final
José Miguel Pérez Memorial Cup
Summer Attitude
Armagedon
Golpe De Estado
Halloween Mayhem
Hardcore Weekend
IWA Christmas in PR

Championships

Current championships

Other accolades

Defunct and inactive championships

See also

Professional wrestling in Puerto Rico
List of professional wrestling promotions
International Wrestling Association of Japan
IWA Mid-South

References

External links

 

Puerto Rican professional wrestling promotions
1999 in professional wrestling
2012 in professional wrestling
1999 establishments in Puerto Rico
National Wrestling Alliance members